Steffen Driesen (born November 30, 1981, in Düsseldorf) is a backstroke swimmer from Germany, who competed in two consequentive Summer Olympics for his native country. At the 2004 Summer Olympics in Athens, Greece, he won the silver medal in the 4x100 Medley Relay, alongside Lars Conrad, Jens Kruppa, and Thomas Rupprath.

See also
 German records in swimming

External links
 
 Profile on FINA-website
 

1981 births
Living people
German male swimmers
Male backstroke swimmers
Olympic swimmers of Germany
Swimmers at the 2000 Summer Olympics
Swimmers at the 2004 Summer Olympics
Olympic silver medalists for Germany
Sportspeople from Düsseldorf
World Aquatics Championships medalists in swimming
Medalists at the 2004 Summer Olympics
Olympic silver medalists in swimming
20th-century German people
21st-century German people